Split Rock may refer to:

Places

United States
 Split Rock, New York, also industrial disaster site
 Split Rock, Wisconsin, an unincorporated community
 Split Rock Township, Minnesota

Rock formations
 Split Rock (Bronx, New York), a boulder in Pelham Bay Park, New York City, United States
 Split Rock, or Tracy's Rock, on the Moon
 The Split Rock, a landmark in Easky, Ireland
 Split Rock, Antarctica
 Split Rock (Wyoming), along Sweetwater River

Other uses
Pleiospilos, a genus of South African succulent plants

See also
 Split Rock Lighthouse, Minnesota, United States
 Split Rock Lighthouse State Park, Minnesota, United States
 Split Rock Creek State Park, Minnesota, United States
 Split Rock Wildway, New York, United States
 Split Rock Dam, Australia
 Splitrock Reservoir, New Jersey, United States